Guillaume Bastille (born 21 July 1985) is a Canadian short track speed skater from Rivière-du-Loup, Quebec.

He competed at the 2010 Winter Olympics in Vancouver in the men's 1500 metre short track and the men's 5000 metre relay competitions. On 26 February, he won a gold medal in the 5000 m relay along with Charles Hamelin, François Hamelin, François-Louis Tremblay and Olivier Jean.

References

External links
 Guillaume Bastille at the 2010 Winter Olympics 
 Guillaume Bastille at the ISU

1985 births
Living people
Canadian male short track speed skaters
Olympic short track speed skaters of Canada
Olympic gold medalists for Canada
Olympic medalists in short track speed skating
Short track speed skaters at the 2010 Winter Olympics
Medalists at the 2010 Winter Olympics
People from Rivière-du-Loup
Universiade medalists in short track speed skating
Universiade silver medalists for Canada
Universiade bronze medalists for Canada
Competitors at the 2013 Winter Universiade
21st-century Canadian people